Uhřínov is a municipality and village in Žďár nad Sázavou District in the Vysočina Region of the Czech Republic. It has about 400 inhabitants.

Administrative parts
The village of Šeborov is an administrative part of Uhřínov.

Notable people
Jan Zahradníček (1905–1960), poet; lived here and is buried here

Gallery

References

Villages in Žďár nad Sázavou District